Masanao (written: 政直, 正直, 昌直 or 雅尚) is a masculine Japanese given name. Notable people with the name include:

, Japanese physician
, Japanese diplomat
, Japanese daimyō
, Japanese daimyō
, Japanese samurai
, Japanese samurai, philosopher and educator
, Japanese politician
, Japanese footballer
, Mongolian sumo wrestler
, Japanese daimyō
Masanao (sculptor)

Japanese masculine given names